Michael Richard Ratnarajan Hoole (commonly known as Rajan Hoole) is a Sri Lankan Tamil mathematician, academic and human rights activist. He was one of the founders of University Teachers for Human Rights (UTHR) which documented human rights abuses during the Sri Lankan Civil War.

Early life and family
Hoole is the son of eldest son of Rev. Richard Herbert Ratnathurai Hoole and Jeevamany Somasundaram. He was educated at Chundikuli Girls' College, St. John's College, Jaffna and S. Thomas' College, Mount Lavinia. After school he joined the University of Ceylon. In 1982 he received a Ph.D in mathematical logic from the University of Oxford.

Hoole is married to Kirupa (Kirubai) Selvadurai, a fellow academic from the University of Jaffna. He is the brother of Ratnajeevan Hoole.

Career
Hoole worked as a lecturer in the Department of Mathematics at the National University of Singapore.

Hoole was amongst three hundred academics who, in 1988, formed the University Teachers for Human Rights (Jaffna) to document and report the increasing number of human rights violations in Sri Lanka's civil war. Following the assassination of Rajini Thiranagama, one of the founders of UTHR(J), in 1989, many members of UTHR(J) left the organisation. Hoole, along with fellow UTHR(J) member Kopalasingham Sritharan, left Jaffna and went into hiding but they continued with their UTHR(J) work, documenting atrocities committed by all sides of the civil war.

Hoole and Sritharan were finalists for the 2005 Civil Courage Prize but ultimately won "Certificates of Distinction in Civil Courage" and a $1,000 cash prize. In 2007 Hoole and Sritharan received the Martin Ennals Award for Human Rights Defenders.

Hoole is currently a senior lecturer at the University of Jaffna's Department of Mathematics and Statistics. He was trained as a classical pianist.

Works
 The Broken Palmyra: The Tamil Crisis in Sri Lanka - an Inside Account (1988, UHarvey Mudd College California) (co-author)
 Sri Lanka: the Arrogance of Power : Myths, Decadence and Murder (2001, University Teachers for Human Rights (Jaffna))

References

Academic staff of the University of Jaffna
Alumni of St. John's College, Jaffna
Alumni of S. Thomas' College, Mount Lavinia
Alumni of the University of Ceylon
Alumni of the University of Oxford
Living people
Academic staff of the National University of Singapore
People from Jaffna
Sri Lankan human rights activists
Sri Lankan mathematicians
Sri Lankan Tamil academics
Sri Lankan Tamil activists
Sri Lankan Tamil scientists
Sri Lankan Tamil writers
Year of birth missing (living people)